Novodamus is a genus of Australian cribellate spiders first described by Mark Stephen Harvey in 1995.  it contains only two species.

References

Araneomorphae genera
Nicodamidae